Zivid is a Norwegian machine vision technology company headquartered in Oslo, Norway. It designs and sells 3D color cameras with vision software that are used in autonomous industrial robot cells, collaborative robot (cobot) cells and other industrial automation systems.

The company's primary hardware product is the industrial Zivid Two and Zivid One+ 3D color cameras. It is supported by companion software products: the Zivid Software Development Kit (SDK) and the Zivid Studio, a graphical user interface (GUI).

The Zivid company (originally named Zivid Labs) was founded in 2015, by Henrik Schumann-Olsen and Øysten Skotheim, who were colleagues at SINTEF, Norway's largest independent research organization.

History

2000–2011: Research
Henrik Schumann-Olsen and Øystein Skotheim worked together at SINTEF, conducting research into machine and robot vision solutions covering a range of different 3D imaging techniques. In 2010 Microsoft launched the Kinect motion sensor add-on for Xbox, integrating a new form of 3D depth camera.

2011–2014: Prototype
Microsoft’s Kinect enabled researchers and tech-enthusiasts to modify an off-the-shelf 3D camera, and at SINTEF the vision team's concept of a ‘Kinect for Industry’ was born. By the end of 2014, a prototype product, named ShapeCrafter 3D, was introduced, showcasing 3D vision capabilities and color point clouds. ShapeCrafter was demonstrated for the first time at VISION 2014 in Stuttgart, Germany.

2015: Foundation
The Research Council of Norway provided 6M NOK for further research into 3D industrial machine vision cameras. Henrik Schumann-Olsen and Øystein Skotheim founded Zivid Labs as a spin-out from SINTEF.

2017: First product
In March 2017, Zivid Labs introduced its first mass-produced product, the Zivid One 3D color camera. The camera was rated IP65 for industrial use.

2018: Second product and success
An upgraded version of Zivid One, the Zivid One+ was launched in November 2018 at VISION 2018 in Stuttgart, Germany. The Zivid One+ product portfolio included three 3D color cameras spanning working distances from 30 cm to 3 m.
In September 2018, logistics company DHL installed its first fully automated e-fulfilment robot in its Behringe, Netherlands warehouse. The robotic system integrated the Zivid One 3D color camera and was used for de-palletizing, picking, and order-fulfilment operations.
The Zivid One 3D camera received Red Dot's "Product Design" award, Vision System Design's "Gold Innovators Award" and inVISION Magazine's "Top Innovation Award". 
Zivid appointed Thomas Embla Bonnerud as CEO. The company changed its name from Zivid Labs to Zivid.

2019: Enhancement and expansion
Zivid introduced a new software development kit and graphical user interface in March 2019. The SDK provided Windows and Linux support, and included a re-engineered API and a second-generation vision engine. The Zivid Studio GUI provided developers with a ready-to-use application for 3D point cloud capture, visualization and exploration.
Zivid opened sales offices in China, South Korea, and North America, and appointed first distributors in Canada, China, Japan and USA.

2020: Third product, software evolution and accessories 
In November 2020, Zivid announced Zivid Two, a faster, high-precision 3D color camera. More compact and lighter in weight than previous products, it was purpose-designed to suit both on-arm and stationary mounted applications.

Major updates to the Zivid software development kit were also announced in June and December 2020. The SDK 2.0 provided: stripe patterns to suppress interreflections, filtering to correct contrast distortion artifacts, enhanced HDR image capture sequencing, and multi-camera calibration. 

To simplify camera mounting, Zivid announced a range of accessories in July 2020. For robot arm mounting, a camera mount, bracket, and extender to the ISO 9409-1-50-4-M6 coupling plate standard  were introduced along with cable guide, power and data cables. For stationary applications, a reconfigurable pan and tilt camera mount was provided.

An all-in-one 3D camera developer kit bundle was introduced in November 2020, comprising: Zivid One+ or Zivid Two camera, accessory set, in-field calibration board, tripod adapter and 2-year warranty.

2022: Product update 
In October 2022, Zivid announced Zivid Two L100 designed to enable robotic picking in deeper, larger bins that are typical of the manufacturing industry. L100 is built on the established Zivid Two platform, and the original Zivid Two will became the Zivid Two M70.

Technology
To obtain a machine-readable 3-dimensional image of a target object, the Zivid camera technology uses a technique known as structured light, or fringe projection, to arrive at a high-definition point cloud, a highly-accurate set of data points in space. A defined grid pattern is projected onto an object in white LED light, and a 2D color image sensor captures any distortion of the pattern as is strikes the surface. By merging multiple images, complete object depth and surface data are acquired and used to create a full-color 3D point cloud. The Zivid 3D color camera integrates a 1920 pixel x 1200 pixel image sensor to produce a high-quality 2.3 Mpixel point cloud resolution, with XYZ coordinate, native RGB and contrast data for each individual pixel in the point cloud. A good point cloud is characterized by a high density of points and no missing data, yielding a lifelike 3D model of the captured scene.

Application
The Zivid One Plus 3D color cameras and software are being used as the machine vision sub-system for a variety of autonomous industrial robot cells, collaborative robot cells and other industrial automation systems.

Covering the range from 300 mm to 3,000 mm, the cameras are applied to tasks including random bin picking, pick-and-place, de-palletizing, assembly, packaging and quality inspection in a range of different manufacturing and logistics sectors.

Corporate identity
The company name Zivid was derived by combining the English word ‘Vivid’, meaning very bright, clear and detailed, with the letter ‘Z’, the depth parameter in a 3D image.

Accolades
inVISION Magazine: Top Innovation Award
Vision Systems Design Innovators Award: Gold
Red Dot: Product Design award
The Research Council of Norway: Innovation Award 2018
Teknisk Ukeblad, NITO, Tekna, Polyteknisk Forening: Tech Award

References

Further reading
 Range imaging
 Structured light
 Structured-light 3D scanner
 Blog: Why 3D machine vision? What’s wrong with 2D machine vision?

External links
 
 Korean website
 Chinese website

Technology companies established in 2015
Companies based in Oslo
Technology companies of Norway
Norwegian companies established in 2015